Channel 20 or TV20 may refer to several television stations:

Argentina 
 Argenvisión in Buenos Aires

Bolivia 
Red UNO in Santa Cruz de la Sierra

Canada
The following television stations operate on virtual channel 20 in Canada:
 CFVS-DT-1, Rouyn-Noranda, Quebec
 CJMT-DT-1, London, Ontario
 CKMI-DT, Quebec City, Quebec

Israel
 Channel 20 (Israel)

Mexico
 XHEXT-TDT, Azteca 7 in Mexicali, Baja California
 XHCJH-TDT, Azteca 7 in Ciudad Juárez, Chihuahua
 XHUNAM-TDT, Mexico City
 Sistema Público de Radiodifusión del Estado Mexicano transmitters that carry TV UNAM place it on virtual channel 20

See also
 Channel 20 virtual TV stations in the United States

For UHF frequencies covering 506-512 MHz
 Channel 20 TV stations in Canada
 Channel 20 TV stations in Mexico
 Channel 20 digital TV stations in the United States
 Channel 20 low-power TV stations in the United States

20